Grégory Fichten (born 13 August 1990) is a French rugby union player. His position is Prop and he currently plays for Montpellier in the Top 14. He began his career with RC Narbonne in the Pro D2 before moving to Montpellier in 2016.

References

External links
  Grégory Fichten on lnr.fr

1990 births
Living people
French rugby union players
Montpellier Hérault Rugby players
RC Narbonne players
Rugby union props